Comarca de Almazán is a comarca of the province of Soria, in Castile and Leon (Spain). It has 22 municipalities located in the centre-south of the province.

The capital of the comarca is Almazán.

Comarcas of the Province of Soria
Geography of the Province of Soria